The M8 motorway is a planned Hungarian motorway, which will, upon completion, connect the western part of the country, near the Austrian border to Szolnok in the central part of the country. It will be partially concurrent with the European route E66 (Graz – Veszprém – Székesfehérvár).

The construction was reported to be started in 2007 (a few tiny sections were built, including the Pentele Bridge over the Danube) and it had been planned to be completed around 2015 but as of 2013 the plans were not even finalized and the even the permission phase for several smaller parts took more than 2 years.

The completed section of motorway is 8 km long, stretching from Baracs to Apostag. Its major junctions are with M6 (Baracs), Route 6 (Kisapostag), and Route 51 (Apostag). It crosses over the Danube river, on the Pentele Bridge.

8
Proposed roads in Hungary